Commune de Grande-Synthe v. France is a lawsuit filed by the commune of Grande-Synthe against the Government of France, alleging that the government has not taken enough action to reduce greenhouse gas emissions to fulfill its commitments according to domestic and international law. In July 2021, the Conseil d'État ruled that the French government must take all necessary measures to reduce emissions by March 2022.

References

2021 in case law
Conseil d'État (France)
Environment of France
Climate change litigation
2021 in France
French case law
History of Nord (French department)